Jacob Italiano (born 30 July 2001), is an Australian professional footballer who plays as an attacking midfielder for Bundesliga club Borussia Mönchengladbach.

Honours
Perth Glory
 A-League: Premiers 2018–19

Australia U23
AFC U-23 Championship third place: 2020

Australia U17
AFF U-16 Youth Championship: 2016

References

External links

2001 births
Living people
Australian soccer players
Australian expatriate sportspeople in Germany
Association football forwards
Perth Glory FC players
Borussia Mönchengladbach players
A-League Men players
National Premier Leagues players
Australian people of Italian descent
Soccer players from Perth, Western Australia